Wavelet packet bases are designed by dividing the frequency axis in intervals of varying sizes. These bases are particularly well adapted to decomposing signals that have different behavior in different frequency intervals. If  has properties that vary in time, it is then  more appropriate to decompose  in a block basis that segments the time axis in intervals with sizes that are adapted to the signal structures.

Block Bases 
Block orthonormal bases are obtained by dividing the time axis in consecutive intervals  with

The size  of each interval is arbitrary. Let . An interval is covered by the dilated rectangular window

Theorem 1. 

is a block orthonormal basis of

Proof 
One can verify that the dilated and translated family

If , then  since their supports do not overlap. Thus, the family  is orthonormal. To expand a signal  in this family, it is decomposed as a sum of separate blocks

and each block  is decomposed in the basis

Block Fourier Basis 
A block basis is constructed with the Fourier basis of :

and

This can also be interpreted as an effect of periodization.

Discrete Block Bases 
For all , suppose that . Discrete block bases are built with discrete rectangular windows having supports on intervals :

.

Since dilations are not defined in a discrete framework, bases of intervals of varying sizes from a single basis cannot generally be derived. The proof is:

Theorem 2. 
The family

A discrete block basis is constructed with discrete Fourier bases

The resulting block Fourier vectors  have sharp transitions at the window border, and thus are not well localized in frequency. As in the continuous case, the decomposition of smooth signals  may produce large-amplitude, high-frequency coefficients because of border effects.

Block Bases of Images 
General block bases of images are constructed by partitioning the plane  into rectangles  of arbitrary length  and width . The following can be denoted:

.

For discrete images, discrete windows that cover each rectangle can be defined

.

is a block basis of

References 
 St´ephane Mallat, A Wavelet Tour of Signal Processing, 3rd

Signal processing